The Kharduri (also Harduri or Charduri) are a group of formerly semi-nomadic Tajiks of unknown origin. They live in the Surxondaryo Region of southeastern Uzbekistan (between Boysun and Gʻuzor). The Kharduri were estimated to number about 8,400 in 1924–25.

See also 
 Chagatai people

References 

Ethnic groups in Uzbekistan
Ethnic Tajik people
Modern nomads